Ambrysus californicus is a species of creeping water bug in the family Naucoridae. It is found in North America.

Subspecies
These two subspecies belong to the species Ambrysus californicus:
 Ambrysus californicus bohartorum Usinger, 1946
 Ambrysus californicus californicus Montandon, 1897

References

Articles created by Qbugbot
Insects described in 1897
Naucoridae